The men's 200 metre individual medley event at the 2012 Summer Olympics took place on 1–2 August at the London Aquatics Centre in London, United Kingdom.

Adding to an unprecedented medal tally to become the most decorated Olympian of all time, Michael Phelps made another milestone as the first male swimmer ever to defend his third straight Olympic title in the same individual event with a touch-out triumph over Ryan Lochte. Dominating the race from the start, Phelps held off a final showdown from Lochte on the freestyle leg to claim his sixteenth gold and twentieth career medal in 1:54.27. Meanwhile, Lochte came up short in the other half of a difficult double, as he produced his eleventh overall for the silver in 1:54.90, tying an all-time record with Mark Spitz and Matt Biondi. Hungary's László Cseh powered home with the bronze in 1:56.22 to keep the podium intact for the second straight Games.

Brazil's Thiago Pereira finished fourth in 1:56.74, and was followed in fifth and sixth by Japanese duo Kosuke Hagino (1:57.35) and Ken Takakuwa (1:58.53). Great Britain's James Goddard (1:59.05) and Germany's Markus Deibler (1:59.10) also vied for an Olympic medal to round out the historic finale.

Earlier in the semifinals, South Africa's Chad le Clos also earned a spot for the championship final, but later scratched to focus on the 100 m butterfly, allowing Deibler to join the roster. Meanwhile, Austria's Markus Rogan, double silver medalist and four-time Olympian, was disqualified for an illegal dolphin kick after a technical turn from backstroke to breaststroke.

Records
Prior to this competition, the existing world and Olympic records were as follows.

Results

Heats

Semifinals

Semifinal 1

Semifinal 2

Final

References

External links
NBC Olympics Coverage

Men's 200 metre individual medley
Men's events at the 2012 Summer Olympics